Gagandeep Dosanjh (born 1 November 1990) is a Canadian professional soccer player who plays as a midfielder.

Club career

Youth
Born in Abbotsford, British Columbia to Pavinder and Gurpal Dosanjh, both Indian immigrants from Punjab. Dosanjh started his career in the USL PDL with the Abbotsford Rangers in 2007. He then joined the Whitecaps U-23 where he stayed until 2010. While with the Whitecaps U-23, Dosanjh went on loan to Energie Cottbus U23 side in the Oberliga.

Then, in 2010, Dosanjh joined the University of British Columbia where he played for the UBC Thunderbirds of the Canadian Interuniversity Sport leagues. In his first year with the side he helped lead the team to the Canada West title. Individually he earned a Canada West first team all-star selection and CIS Championship tournament all-star selection. In 2012 Dosanjh lead the Thunderbirds to 2012 CIS Championship where he scored four goals in three games. He also earned the UBC Thunderbirds Bus Phillips Memorial Trophy winner in 2013 as the UBC Male Athlete of the Year as well as CIS Championship tournament all-star selection and he also won the CIS Championship MVP award. Overall during his three seasons with the team, Dosanjh scored 26 goals in 50 games.

Also in 2012, during the summer, Dosanjh re-joined the Whitecaps organization as captain of the Vancouver Whitecaps FC U-23 side during the 2012 PDL season. He scored four goals in fifteen matches in his only season with the team.

For the 2015–16 season, Gagan has returned to UBC Thunderbirds program. Dosanjh scored seven times during the regular season, which him seventh on the Canada West leaderboard. He also third in the league with five assists. This earned him second-team CIS honours in his final season. He was also named a Canada-West All-Star.

FC Edmonton
On 1 August 2013, it was confirmed that Dosanjh had signed with FC Edmonton of the North American Soccer League. He made his professional debut for the team on 24 August 2013 against the Tampa Bay Rowdies at Al Lang Stadium in which he came on in the 58th minute for Robert Garrett as Edmonton drew 1–1.

International career
In 2007 Dosanjh made his debut for the Canada U17 team.

Career statistics

References

External links 
 FC Edmonton Profile.

1990 births
Living people
Association football midfielders
Canada men's youth international soccer players
Canadian expatriate soccer players
Canadian people of Indian descent
Canadian soccer players
Expatriate footballers in Germany
FC Energie Cottbus II players
FC Edmonton players
Fraser Valley Mariners players
North American Soccer League players
Sportspeople from Abbotsford, British Columbia
Soccer people from British Columbia
UBC Thunderbirds soccer players
USL League Two players
Vancouver Whitecaps FC U-23 players